Oula Abass Traoré (born 29 September 1995) is a Burkinabé professional footballer who plays as a left-back for Lviv and the Burkina Faso national team.

International career
Traoré made his debut for the Burkina Faso national team in a 0–0 friendly tie with the DR Congo on 9 June 2019.

References

External links
 
 

1995 births
Living people
Burkinabé footballers
Association football fullbacks
FC Lviv players
Ukrainian Premier League players
Burkinabé expatriate footballers
Expatriate footballers in Ukraine
Burkinabé expatriate sportspeople in Ukraine
Burkina Faso international footballers
2021 Africa Cup of Nations players
21st-century Burkinabé people